The Ruya Foundation, or Ruya Foundation for Contemporary Culture in Iraq, is an Iraqi registered not-for-profit, non-governmental organization. Founded in 2012, Ruya Foundation's board is made up of  Tamara Chalabi (chair), Reem Shather-Kubba, and Shwan Ibrahim Taha.

Exhibitions 
Ruya Foundation's exhibition programme comprises work by Iraqi artists in a variety of media: sculpture, painting, installation, video and photography. The organisation does not have a permanent collection, but a revolving exhibition programme onsite at its Ruya Shop location on Mutanabbi Street, Baghdad.

Projects 
Ruya Foundation maintains a database of Iraqi artists.

The Foundation has published Ruya Notebooks since 2017. A monograph on the work of Iraqi photographer Latif al-Ani which they co-published won the Historical Book Award at Les Rencontres d’Arles in 2017.

RUYA MAPS 
In 2018, Ruya Foundation launched a sister organisation, RUYA MAPS. The UK registered charity was established to address specific needs, identified by the Ruya Foundation whilst carrying out its unique work in Iraq, that were found to be applicable internationally. It is led by Tamara Chalabi and has a programme of exhibitions, commissions and publications.
RUYA MAPS hosted Venezuelan artist Pepe López's first solo in the UK, Crisálida, at Fitzrovia Chapel in 2017. They held an unofficial collateral exhibition at the 58th Venice Biennale, 'Heartbreak,' which featured artists from areas of conflict around the Mediterranean.

References

Cultural organizations based in Iraq
Non-profit organisations based in the United Kingdom